Sylvain Gagnon (born May 30, 1970) is a Canadian short track speed skater who competed in the 1992 Winter Olympics.

Gagnon was born in Dolbeau-Mistassini, Quebec and is the older brother of Marc Gagnon.

In 1992 Gagnon was a member of the Canadian relay team which won the silver medal in the 5000 metre relay competition.

External links
 profile
  Sylvain Gagnon at International Skating Union

1970 births
Living people
Canadian male short track speed skaters
Olympic short track speed skaters of Canada
Short track speed skaters at the 1992 Winter Olympics
Olympic silver medalists for Canada
People from Dolbeau-Mistassini
Olympic medalists in short track speed skating
Medalists at the 1992 Winter Olympics
Sportspeople from Quebec